
Gmina Racławice is a rural gmina (administrative district) in Miechów County, Lesser Poland Voivodeship, in southern Poland.

Villages
Gmina Racławice contains the villages and settlements of Dale, Dosłońce, Dziemierzyce, Głupczów, Górka Kościejowska, Góry Miechowskie, Janowiczki, Klonów, Kościejów, Marchocice, Miroszów and Racławice.

Neighbouring gminas
Gmina Racławice is bordered by the gminas of Działoszyce, Miechów, Pałecznica, Radziemice, Skalbmierz and Słaboszów.

References
Polish official population figures 2006

Raclawice
Miechów County